Budworth may refer to:

People:
Charles Budworth (1869–1921), British artillery officer
Neil Budworth (born 1982), English rugby league footballer
Richard Budworth (1867–1937), English rugby union forward
William Budworth (1699–1745), schoolmaster at Brewood in Staffordshire, England

Places:
Aston by Budworth, civil parish in the unitary authority of Cheshire East and the ceremonial county of Cheshire, England
Great Budworth, civil parish and village in the unitary authority of Cheshire West and Chester and the ceremonial county of Cheshire, England
Little Budworth, civil parish and village in the unitary authority of Cheshire West and Chester and the ceremonial county of Cheshire, England